Hui Cheung-ching, SBS, JP (4 September 1942 in Puning, Guangdong, China – 6 January 2005 in Hong Kong) was the member of the Legislative Council of Hong Kong in 1998–2004 for the Import and Export constituency. He was the vice-chairman of the Hong Kong Progressive Alliance, the pro-Beijing business-friendly party. He is the honorary president of the Hong Kong Chinese Importers' and Exporters' Association.

References

1942 births
2005 deaths
Democratic Alliance for the Betterment and Progress of Hong Kong politicians
Hong Kong Progressive Alliance politicians
HK LegCo Members 1998–2000
HK LegCo Members 2000–2004
Members of the Selection Committee of Hong Kong
Recipients of the Silver Bauhinia Star